Sant Vicenç de Montalt, is a municipality in the comarca of the Maresme in Catalonia, Spain. It is situated on the coast between Sant Andreu de Llavaneres and Arenys de Mar, below the  range, with the main settlement slightly inland. The main N-II road along the coast passes through the municipality, linked to the town by a local road. There are also roads to Arenys de Munt and to Mataró, and a station on the RENFE railway line at Caldes d'Estrac.

Demography

References

 Panareda Clopés, Josep Maria; Rios Calvet, Jaume; Rabella Vives, Josep Maria (1989). Guia de Catalunya, Barcelona: Caixa de Catalunya.  (Spanish).  (Catalan).

External links

Official website 
 Government data pages 
Historic heritage in Sant Vicenç de Montalt

Municipalities in Maresme